Groupon MyCityDeal is a collective buying power, deal-of-the-day website that is focused on bringing discounted price deals in the lifestyle and leisure sector to UK and European markets. Founded in Berlin as CityDeal in December 2009, the collective now serves Germany, France, Spain, Sweden, Austria, the Netherlands, United Kingdom, Italy, Ireland and Turkey. The service was acquired in May 2010 by Groupon, an operator of a similar service in the United States, and was co-branded under the Groupon name. The acquisition increased Groupon's operations in European markets.

References

External links
Official Website
Groupon Official Blog
Coupons & Discounts

Deal of the day services
Marketing companies of the United States